Blue Ant Media Inc. is a Canadian broadcasting and media company headquartered in Toronto, Ontario. The company was founded by Michael MacMillan and formed in 2011 following the acquisition of Glassbox Television. Its name was chosen in reference to William Gibson's informal "Blue Ant" trilogy.

The company owns both domestic and international television channels, studios, and publishing assets.

History
On December 22, 2011, Blue Ant Media announced that Torstar had acquired a minority stake in the company.

On December 21, 2011, Blue Ant Media announced that it had entered into an agreement to purchase specialty broadcaster High Fidelity HDTV. It initially purchased 29.9% of the company with the remaining 70.1% acquired when the deal was approved by the Canadian Radio-television and Telecommunications Commission. The acquisition was completed on August 1, 2012.

On August 17, 2012, Blue Ant Media announced that it would be purchasing the specialty channel Bold from the Canadian Broadcasting Corporation for an undisclosed amount, conditional on government approval. After initially purchasing a 15% minority stake in Canadian publishing company Quarto Communications in the summer of 2011, Blue Ant Media purchased the remaining shares in the company in December 2012, which had been renamed Cottage Life Media. Bold would later relaunch under the Cottage Life brand.

In April 2014, the company purchased a minority stake in the digital media company and multi-channel network Omnia Media. In so doing, they retained CEO Tamoor Shafi and Co-Founder Austin Long to focus on expanding its reach with brands.

In November 2014, the company bought a majority stake in Choice TV, marking their first international expansion.

In December 2015, Blue Ant Media and Smithsonian Networks teamed to launch Blue Skye Entertainment, a new UK-based company exclusively focused on 4K content.

In May 2017, Blue Ant Media bought the Asia-Pacific broadcaster Racat Group, including factual producer NHNZ, Singapore-based studio Beach House Pictures, Sydney-based Northern Pictures, developer Runaway Play, and a majority stake in ZooMoo. The purchase was considered to be complementary to the Blue Ant's factual and nature-oriented programming.

In February 2018, Omnia Media was renamed Blue Ant Digital Studios, coinciding with the launch of several new original series on Facebook Watch, and an accompanying expansion beyond video gaming content. In October 2018, Blue Ant acquired the Toronto-based Saloon Media.

In December 2020, Blue Ant entered the free ad-supported streaming television (FAST) market by launching HauntTV, a channel devoted to horror and supernatural programming, on The Roku Channel in Canada. It has since launched several additional FAST channels in Canada and the United States; including CrimeTime, TotalCrime, Homeful, and HistoryTime.

Assets

Television
 BBC Earth (Canadian TV channel)
 BBC First (Canadian TV channel)
 Cottage Life
 Love Nature (Canada, EMEA)
 Makeful
 Smithsonian Channel (Canada)
 T+E

Production companies 
 Beach House Pictures (Singapore)
 Blue Ant Digital Studios (Los Angeles)
 Look Mom! Productions (Toronto)
 NHNZ (New Zealand)
 Northern Pictures (Sydney)
 Saloon Media Inc. (Toronto)

Print
 Australian Geographic
 Cottage Life
 Cottage Life West
 Outdoor Canada

Former
 A.Side TV
 Antenna Pictures (London)
 Choice TV (New Zealand)
 HGTV (New Zealand)
 Blue Ant Entertainment (Asia-Pacific)
 Blue Ant Extreme (Asia-Pacific)
 ZooMoo (Asia-Pacific and Latin America)

References

External links
 

 
Television broadcasting companies of Canada
Television production companies of Canada
Companies based in Toronto
2011 establishments in Canada
Mass media companies established in 2011